Mathilda Fogman (1835-1921) was a Swedish and Finnish midwife. She was an influential spiritual leader within Laestadianism in Övertorneå, something quite unique for her gender, as women usually had a low position within the Laestadian movement.

References

1835 births
1921 deaths
Swedish midwives
Laestadians
Female religious leaders
19th-century Finnish people
19th-century Swedish people
Finnish midwives
19th-century Finnish women